Myong Cha-hyon (born 20 March 1990) is a North Korean international football player.

Career
He plays as midfielder. In summer 2009 together with other two players from Sobaeksu, An Il-bom and Ri Kwang-il, he moved to Serbia and signed a one-year contract with FK Radnički Kragujevac. They played in one of the Serbian third levels, the Serbian League West.

He has been a part of the North Korea national football team since 2010. By September 2016, besides the 3 official appearances and 2 goals, he also played one unofficial game in 2016.

He earlier had been part of the North Korea national under-17 football team at the 2007 FIFA U-17 World Cup where he played four games. Later, he was part of the North Korea national under-19 football team at the 2008 AFC U-19 Championship.

Honours
Radnički Kragujevac
Serbian League West: 2009–10

April 25
DPR Korea Premier Football League: 2010, 2011, 2012, 2013, 2015, 2017, 2017–18, 2018-19

International goals
Scores and results are list North Korea's goal tally first.

References

1990 births
Living people
North Korean footballers
North Korea international footballers
Sobaeksu Sports Club players
FK Radnički 1923 players
Expatriate footballers in Serbia
Association football midfielders